The XXII Bomber Command was a United States Army Air Forces unit.  It was assigned to Second Air Force at Peterson Field, Colorado.  It was inactivated on 13 February 1945.

Began organization for second B-29 Superfortress command in Pacific under Second Air Force. Wings attached but never permanently assigned. Organization never got beyond forming Headquarters echelon and Headquarters squadron.  Inactivated before any operational groups assigned, as XX Bomber Command units were reassigned from India to the Marianas, eliminating need for command.

Lineage
 Constituted as the XXII Bomber Command (Very Heavy) on 4 August 1944
 Activated on 14 August 1944
 Disbanded on 13 February 1945

Assignments
 Second Air Force, 14 August 1944 – 13 February 1945 (Attached to 17th Bombardment Operational Training Wing)

Stations
 Peterson Field, Colorado, 14 August 1944 – 13 February 1945

Components
 315th Bombardment Wing, Very Heavy (Attached), c. 14 August-c. 7 December 1944
 316th Bombardment Wing, Very Heavy (Attached), c. 14 August-c. 7 December 1944

References

Notes

Bibliography

 

22
Strategic bombing units and formations
Military units and formations established in 1944
Military units and formations disestablished in 1945